The 1960 Minnesota Golden Gophers football team represented the University of Minnesota in the Big Ten Conference during the 1960 NCAA University Division football season. In their seventh year under head coach Murray Warmath, the Golden Gophers compiled an 8–2 record and outscored their opponents 228 to 88.

The Gophers were led by Sandy Stephens, the first African-American All-American starting quarterback at the school. Murray Warmath entered his seventh season as the Minnesota head football coach on the heels of three consecutive losing seasons. Expectations to start the season were not very high as the Golden Gophers were not ranked by a single news service. The Gophers opened the season with a 26–14 non-conference win at No. 12 Nebraska. They shut out both Indiana and Northwestern, then also blanked Michigan 10–0 at Michigan Stadium to win the Little Brown Jug. A win over non-conference Kansas State put Minnesota at No. 3. The next game at No. 1 Iowa was one of the most notable games in the Floyd of Rosedale rivalry. Minnesota won 27–10 and were top-ranked, but then lost to Purdue the next week. After Minnesota cruised to a 26–7 victory over Wisconsin, the Gophers were tied with Iowa in the Big Ten standings, each with a loss. The final AP poll of November 29 was one of the closest ever: Minnesota with 17½ first-place votes, Mississippi 16, and Iowa 12½. The Golden Gophers had earned their fourth AP national championship and first-ever trip to the Rose Bowl in the process.

Although No. 6 Washington upset No. 1 Minnesota 17–7 in the Rose Bowl in January, the post-season loss did not affect the Golden Gophers' national championship since the final AP and Coaches' Polls were released at the conclusion of the regular season in late November and did not consider the bowl results. The major wire-service polls changed this policy in 1965 (AP) and 1974 (Coaches). 

Guard Tom Brown received the team's Most Valuable Player award, was a consensus first-team All-American, won the Outland Trophy, finished second in the Heisman Trophy voting, and received the Chicago Tribune Silver Football, given to the Big Ten most valuable player. Brown, end Tom Hall, and center Greg Larson were named All-Big Ten first team. Tackle Frank Brixius was named an Academic All-American and Academic All-Big Ten.

Total attendance at five home games was 334,954, an average of 55,825 per game. The largest crowd was against Illinois.

Schedule

Rankings

Game summaries

Iowa

Sources: Box Score and Game Story

References

Minnesota
Minnesota Golden Gophers football seasons
College football national champions
Big Ten Conference football champion seasons
Minnesota Golden Gophers football